Ali (born 10 October 1967) is an Indian actor, comedian, and TV presenter who works predominantly in Telugu films and television. He acted in more than 1000 films in Telugu. He is a recipient of two Nandi Awards and two Filmfare Awards South.

Early life
Ali was born in Rajahmundry, Andhra Pradesh, India. His father was a tailor and his mother was a home maker. He has one younger brother named Khayyum, who is also an actor. Ali married Zubeda Sultana in 1994. The couple has two daughters and a son.

Career
Ali came into the movie industry with the help of Jit Mohan Mitra, Rajahmundry's musical company. He debuted in the movie Nindu Noorellu in 1979 under the direction of K. Raghavendra Rao. He went to Chennai when director Bharathi Raja was looking for child actors for his movie "Seethakoka Chiluka", and was given a role (he previously played a role in Nindu Noorellu). As a child Ali acted in several movies. When he was too old to be a child actor he struggled to get roles and later became a comedian in Tollywood.

Director S. V. Krishna Reddy gave him comic roles in his movies, creating new roles for him. Ali developed his own style, which was popularly known as Chaata. Ali acted in the 2010 Kannada film, Super, which was highly acclaimed.

Ali is a brand ambassador for anti-itching medicine Manmohan Jaadoo Malaam. He became host for a talkie show called Ali Talkies in MAA TV. He is also host of the popular talk show Alitho Saradaga on ETV. He also makes his Jabardasth debut as an ad hoc judge of the show.

Political career
Ali joined YSRCP on 11 March 2019. He was appointed as Electronic Media Adviser to Government of Andhra Pradesh on 27th October 2022.

Awards

Filmography

References

External links

Male actors from Andhra Pradesh
Indian male film actors
Living people
Telugu male actors
Indian male comedians
Telugu stand-up comedians
Filmfare Awards South winners
Nandi Award winners
People from Rajahmundry
20th-century Indian male actors
21st-century Indian male actors
Telugu comedians
Male actors in Telugu cinema
1968 births
People from East Godavari district
People from Andhra Pradesh
Male actors from Rajahmundry
Male actors in Telugu television
Indian television talk show hosts
Indian game show hosts